RNase PH is a tRNA nucleotidyltransferase, present in archaea and bacteria, that is involved in tRNA processing. Contrary to hydrolytic enzymes, it is a phosphorolytic enzyme, meaning that it uses inorganic phosphate as a reactant to cleave nucleotide-nucleotide bonds, releasing diphosphate nucleotides. The active structure of the proteins is a homohexameric complex, consisting of three ribonuclease (RNase) PH dimers. RNase PH has homologues in many other organisms, which are referred to as RNase PH-like proteins. The part of another larger protein with a domain that is very similar to RNase PH is called an RNase PH domain (RPD).

See also 
Two highly related exoribonuclease complexes:
 Polynucleotide phosphorylase
 Exosome complex

References

External links 
 Crystal structure of Aquifex aeolicus RNase PH at the RCSB Protein Data Bank

Ribonucleases
EC 2.7.7